The Hawks Nest Tunnel disaster was a large-scale incident of occupational lung disease as the result of the construction of the Hawks Nest Tunnel near Gauley Bridge, West Virginia, as part of a hydroelectric project.  This project is considered to be one of the worst industrial disasters in American history.

Tunnel
To generate electricity for a plant downstream at Alloy, Union Carbide's Kanawha and New River Power Company subsidiary decided to divert the New River to improve its power generation ability.  Beginning in 1927, its contractor Rinehart & Dennis began construction of the  tunnel carrying the river under Gauley Mountain.  A dam was constructed immediately below Hawks Nest to divert most of the New River flow into the tunnel.  It then re-enters the river near Gauley Bridge leaving a section known as "the Dries" in between.

Silica
Facing widespread unemployment during the Great Depression, about three thousand men, three-fourths of whom were Black, came to West Virginia to dig the tunnel. They worked ten- to fifteen-hour shifts, using drills and dynamite to mine the sandstone, which is composed primarily of cemented quartz (silica) sand. The workers completed the project more than twice as fast as original projections. They were not given any masks or breathing equipment to use while mining, although management wore such equipment during inspection visits. Black workers told Congress in 1936 that they were denied breaks and even forced to work at gunpoint. As a result of the exposure to silica dust, many workers developed silicosis, a debilitating lung disease caused by the effects of silica dust in the lungs. A large number of the workers eventually died from silicosis, in some cases as quickly as within a year.

There are no definitive statistics as to the death toll from the Hawks Nest disaster. According to a historical marker on site, there were 109 admitted deaths. A Congressional hearing placed the death toll at 476.  Other sources range from 700 to over 1,000 deaths amongst the 3,000 workers.  Many of the workers at the site were African-Americans from the southern United States who returned home or left the region after becoming sick, making it difficult to calculate an accurate total.

Cultural references
Muriel Rukeyser wrote a poetry sequence, "The Book of the Dead", about this disaster, which can be found in her collection of poems : U.S. 1, New York, Covici and Friede, 1938.
Vladimir Pozner's Disunited States (chapter "Cadavers, By-products of Dividends"), Seven Stories Press, 2014 (Les Etats-Désunis was originally published in French in 1938)
Hubert Skidmore, a West Virginian, immortalized the tragic events from the common man's perspective in his book Hawk's Nest which followed the fictional accounts of several tunnel workers and their families. Skidmore wrote the book only a few years after the incident (originally published in 1941) and likely used direct sources for his story development.
Hawks Nest is also mentioned in a section entitled Dying for a Living: The Hawk's Nest Incident in the book Trust Us, We're Experts by Sheldon Rampton and John Stauber.
Under the pseudonym of "Pinewood Tom," Josh White wrote and sang "Silicosis Is Killing Me," describing the plight of the miners.
Included in Saints and Villains, a 1998 novel by Denise Giardina.

Hawks Nest Workers Memorial and a Grave Site

Hawks Nest Workers Memorial and a Grave Site is located at 98 Hilltop Drive in Mount Lookout, near Summersville Lake and U.S. Route 19. The site is located several miles from Martha White’s farm at Summersville  where many of the black miners were buried, since they were not allowed to be buried in "white" cemeteries. The Memorial has the following text:
 This Memorial honors an estimated 764 tunnel workers who died from mining a 3.8 mile tunnel through Gauley Mountain to divert water from the New River to a hydroelectric plant near Gauley Bridge in 1930-31. The tunnel cut through almost pure silica in some areas and exposed the unprotected workers to silica dust that quickly caused acute silicosis, a fatal lung disease.  This disaster is considered America's worst industrial accident. Workers in the tunnel were primarily migrant workers, mostly black, who were paid a few dollars per day. When they became sick, many were driven out of the camps to die elsewhere. Those African Americans who died in the camps could not be buried in local "white" cemeteries. A few were sent by rail back to their families. More were taken at night under the cover of darkness to Summersville and buried unceremoniously on a farm. Later these graves had to be moved to widen US Route 19. The remains were disinterred in 1972 and transported several miles to the present site. The decomposed remains we placed in child size coffins and reburied here, resulting about 48 small grave depressions seen at this grave site. 

The memorial was created at the site, unmarked for 40 years, where Department of Highways reburied the bodies of about 48 miners while widening U.S. Route 19. The location of the site was rediscovered with help of West Virginia State University professor Richard Hartman, after local couple George and Charlotte Yeager spearheaded effort to build the memorial in 2009. The Memorial was dedicated on September 7, 2012.

There is also a Historical Marker at nearby Hawks Nest State Park, which reads:
Construction of nearby tunnel, diverting waters of New River through Gauley Mt for hydroelectric power, resulted in state's worst industrial disaster.  Silica rock dust caused 109 admitted deaths in mostly black, migrant underground work force of 3,000.  Congressional hearing placed toll at 476 for 1930-35.  Tragedy brought recognition of acute silicosis as occupational lung disease and compensation legislation to protect workers.

See also
 Hawks Nest State Park
 New River

References

External links
About the Hawk's Nest Incident
Silicosis: From Public Menace to Litigation Target by Wade Goodwyn, National Public Radio
Work Safely With Silica
"The Book of the Dead" by Muriel Rukeyser
The Hawk's Nest Tunnel Disaster: Summersville, WV

African-American history of West Virginia
Disasters in West Virginia
Construction accidents in the United States
Fayette County, West Virginia
Health disasters in the United States
Tunnel disasters
1931 in West Virginia
Industrial accidents and incidents in the United States
1931 disasters in the United States